The Stikine River Provincial Park is a provincial park in British Columbia. The park covers a total area of approximately 217,000 hectares. The main feature of the Stikine River Provincial Park is a portion of the Stikine River known as "The Grand Canyon". This portion of the river is approximately eighty kilometers long and runs through a canyon that has been created from the river cutting through the rock that now forms the walls of the "canyon".

See also
Spatsizi Plateau Wilderness Provincial Park

References

External links

Provincial parks of British Columbia
Stikine Country
Protected areas established in 1987
1987 establishments in British Columbia